Hakimabad (also Romanized as Ḩakīmābād; also known as Khanamabad and Khānomābād) is a village in Dashtabi-ye Sharqi Rural District, Dashtabi District, Buin Zahra County, Qazvin Province, Iran. At the 2006 census, its population was 183, in 46 families.

References 

Populated places in Buin Zahra County